Qışlaq, Lerik may refer to:
Qışlaq, Aşağı Amburdərə
Qışlaq, Vıjaker
Qışlaq, Zərigümaco